Liliana Bakhtiari is a community organizer who placed first in the November 2, 2021 non-partisan election to Atlanta City Council in Atlanta, Georgia, United States. She won the November 30 runoff for District 5.

Bakhtiari was born to Iranian immigrants and raised in Atlanta, Georgia. She is non-binary and queer, and uses she/they personal pronouns.

In November 30, 2021, became the first out queer Muslim elected official from Georgia and is in a non-monogamous relationship with two partners.

References

Living people
American people of Iranian descent
American Muslims
Atlanta City Council members
LGBT Muslims
LGBT people from Georgia (U.S. state)
American LGBT city council members
Queer people
Women city councillors in Georgia (U.S. state)
Year of birth missing (living people)
21st-century American women